Pachydactylus acuminatus is a species of lizard in the family Gekkonidae, a family also known as the typical geckos. The species P. acuminatus is endemic to Namibia. It was once believed to be a subspecies of Weber's thick-toed gecko (Pachydactylus weberi) but was lifted to species status in 2006.

Discovery and taxonomy
Pachydactylus acuminatus was originally described by Fitzsimons in 1941 as Pachydactylus weberi acuminatus, from eight specimens housed in the Transvaal Museum, Pretoria—seven immature individuals and one adult. The position of  Pachydactylus weberi acuminatus was later reassessed by Bauer, who lifted it to species status in 2006.

Distribution
Pachydactylus acuminatus is known only from Namibia, in the Lüderitz, Bethanie, Keetmanshoop, Maltahöhe, and Swakopmund Districts.

References

acuminatus
Geckos of Africa
Reptiles of Namibia
Endemic fauna of Namibia
Reptiles described in 1941
Taxa named by Vivian Frederick Maynard FitzSimons